Karen Hu may refer to:

 Hu Yingzhen, Taiwanese actress and model
 Hu Yanliang, Chinese model